The Alte River is a small river in the Portuguese region of the Algarve. The river along with the Algibre River, another tributary, becomes the Quarteira River after the two rivers conflux.

Description 
The Algibre is one of a number of small rivers in the central Algarve which make up the water ecosystem known as the Querença–Silves Aquifer System.

Gallery

References 

Rivers of Portugal
Rivers of the Algarve